The 1993–94 Meistriliiga season was the fourth season of the Meistriliiga, the top level of ice hockey in Estonia. Seven teams participated in the league, and Kreenholm Narva won the championship.

First round

Final round

5th–7th Place

External links
Season on hockeyarchives.info

Meistriliiga
Meist
Meistriliiga (ice hockey) seasons